In Greek mythology, Nesaea, Nesaia or Nisaea (Ancient Greek: Νησαίη Nêsaiê means 'the dweller on islands') was the 'white' Nereid of islands, one of the 50 marine-nymph daughters of the 'Old Man of the Sea' Nereus and the Oceanid Doris.

Mythology 
Nesaea was one of the Nereids who gathered round Thetis in her sympathetic grief for Achilles' loss of Patroclus.

In some accounts, Nesaea, together with her sisters Thalia, Cymodoce and Spio, was one of the nymphs in the train of Cyrene  Later on, these four together with their other sisters Thetis, Melite and Panopea, were able to help the hero Aeneas and his crew during a storm.

Legacy 
This name is used to describe a genus of plants in the family Lythraceae.

Notes

References 
Nereids

 Apollodorus, The Library with an English Translation by Sir James George Frazer, F.B.A., F.R.S. in 2 Volumes, Cambridge, MA, Harvard University Press; London, William Heinemann Ltd. 1921. ISBN 0-674-99135-4. Online version at the Perseus Digital Library. Greek text available from the same website.
 Bartelink, Dr. G.J.M. (1988). Prisma van de mythologie. Utrecht: Het Spectrum.
 Gaius Julius Hyginus, Fabulae from The Myths of Hyginus translated and edited by Mary Grant. University of Kansas Publications in Humanistic Studies. Online version at the Topos Text Project.
 Hesiod, Theogony from The Homeric Hymns and Homerica with an English Translation by Hugh G. Evelyn-White, Cambridge, MA.,Harvard University Press; London, William Heinemann Ltd. 1914. Online version at the Perseus Digital Library. Greek text available from the same website.
 Homer, The Iliad with an English Translation by A.T. Murray, Ph.D. in two volumes. Cambridge, MA., Harvard University Press; London, William Heinemann, Ltd. 1924. . Online version at the Perseus Digital Library.
 Homer, Homeri Opera in five volumes. Oxford, Oxford University Press. 1920. . Greek text available at the Perseus Digital Library.
 Kerényi, Carl, The Gods of the Greeks, Thames and Hudson, London, 1951.
Publius Vergilius Maro, Aeneid. Theodore C. Williams. trans. Boston. Houghton Mifflin Co. 1910. Online version at the Perseus Digital Library.
Publius Vergilius Maro, Bucolics, Aeneid, and Georgics. J. B. Greenough. Boston. Ginn & Co. 1900. Latin text available at the Perseus Digital Library.
Publius Vergilius Maro, Bucolics, Aeneid, and Georgics of Vergil. J. B. Greenough. Boston. Ginn & Co. 1900. Online version at the Perseus Digital Library.

Deities in the Iliad
Deities in the Aeneid